Blackall Airport  is an airport located  west southwest of Blackall, Queensland, Australia.

Airlines and destinations

See also
 List of airports in Queensland

References

Airports in Queensland
Blackall, Queensland